The Wells Street Gallery (1957–1959) was one of Chicago's vanguard galleries of the late 1950s.

History
In the summer of 1957, a group of artists led by painter Robert Natkin opened a co-operative gallery at an old storefront at 1359 North Wells Street, Chicago. The gallery was tagged "an avant-garde exhibition place filled with the most advanced abstractions in town," by the Chicago Sunday Tribune.

The Wells Street Gallery played a major role in granting young artists like sculptor John Chamberlain and painter Robert Natkin their first one-person exhibitions at a time when too few galleries in Chicago, or elsewhere for that matter, where interested in the work of abstract artists. The gallery closed after only two years, but made a historic contribution in advancing abstract art in Chicago.

Artists
Artist associated with the Wells Street Gallery include: Richard Bogart, Ernest Dieringer, Judith Dolnick, Robert Natkin, Ronald Slowinski, Naomi Tatum, Gerald van de Wiele, Donald Vlack, sculptor John Chamberlain, and photographer Aaron Siskind.

Sources
The Wells Street Gallery Revisited: Now and Then at ArtCat

Defunct art museums and galleries in the United States
Defunct companies based in Chicago
Art galleries established in 1957
Art galleries disestablished in 1959
1957 establishments in Illinois
1959 disestablishments in Illinois